Adam and Eve are figures in the Abrahamic religions.

Adam and Eve may also refer to:

Art and media

Film and television
 Adam and Eve (1923 film), a German silent film directed by Friedrich Porges and Reinhold Schünzel
 Adam and Eve (1928 film), a German silent film directed by Rudolf Biebrach
 Adam and Eve (1949 film), an Italian film directed by Mario Mattoli
 Adam and Eve (1953 film), a Danish film written and directed by Erik Balling
 El pecado de Adán y Eva, a 1969 Mexican film
 National Lampoon's Adam & Eve, a 2005 American film
 Eva & Adam (TV series), a Swedish drama series based on the comics (see below)
 "Adam & Eve", episodic narrative in the 1992 Indian TV series Bible Ki Kahaniyan

Literature and comics
 Eve & Adam, a 2012 novel by Michael Grant and Katherine Applegate 
 Eva & Adam, a Swedish comics series by Johan Unenge and Måns Gahrton
 Adam şi Eva, a 1925 novel by Liviu Rebreanu
 Adam and Eve (manga), a Japanese manga series

Music
 Adam & Eve (band), a 1970s German schlager duo
 Adam and Eve (Catherine Wheel album), 1997
 Adam & Eve (The Flower Kings album), or the title song, 2004
 "Adam & Eve (song)", a 2012 song by Kasey Chambers and Shane Nicholson
 "Adam and Eve", a song by Nas from Nasir
 "Adan y Eva", a song by Paulo Londra

Painting
 Adam and Eve (Cranach), a 1528 double painting by Lucas Cranach the Elder
 Adam and Eve (Dürer), a 1507 pair of panel paintings by Albrecht Dürer
 Adam and Eve (Tintoretto), a  painting by Tintoretto; also a  painting by him
 Adam and Eve (Valadon), a 1909 painting by Suzanne Valadon
 Adam and Eve (Tamara de Lempicka), a 1932 panel painting by Tamara de Lempicka

Business 
 Adam & Eve (company), an American retailer of adult novelties
 Adam & Eve, Birmingham, a former public house in Birmingham, England
 Adam and Eve, Norwich, a public house in Norwich, England, dating to 1249
 Adam + Eve, a clothing line designed by Adam Lippes

Other 
 Y-chromosomal Adam and Mitochondrial Eve
 Adam and Eve (LDS Church)
 'Adam and Eve' rhyming slang for 'believe'
 Adam and Eve, a plant species of the genus Arum, Arum maculatum
 Adam and Eve, a species of orchid, Aplectrum hyemale
 Adam and Eve, name for the two rocks on the mountain Tryfan in Wales
Church of the Immaculate Conception, Dublin, nicknamed "Adam and Eve's"

See also
 Adam and Evil (disambiguation)